Lü Hongchen (Chinese: 吕宏琛; born 16 May 1989 in Tianjin) is a Chinese professional football player who currently plays as defender for Shijiazhuang Ever Bright.

Club career
In July 2007, Lü Hongchen started his professional footballer career with Xinjiang Sport Lottery in the China League Two.
In 2011, Lü transferred to fellow China League Two side Fujian Smart Hero. On 12 August 2015, Lü for Shijiazhuang in the 2015 Chinese Super League against Tianjin Teda.

Career statistics 
Statistics accurate as of match played 31 December 2020.

References

External links
 

1989 births
Living people
Chinese footballers
Footballers from Tianjin
Cangzhou Mighty Lions F.C. players
Chinese Super League players
China League One players
China League Two players
Association football defenders